Pseudaneitea papillata is a species of air-breathing land slug, a terrestrial gastropod mollusc in the family Athoracophoridae, the leaf-veined slugs.

References

Further reading 
 Burton D. W. (January 1962) "New Zealand Land Slugs—Part I." Tuatara 9(3): 87–97.
 Burton D. W. (June 1963) "New Zealand Land Slugs—Part II." Tuatara 11(2): 90–96.
 Powell A. W. B., New Zealand Mollusca, William Collins Publishers Ltd, Auckland, New Zealand 1979 

Athoracophoridae
Gastropods of New Zealand
Gastropods described in 1879